= Witness block =

Slab of metal used in ballistic tests

Used in ballistic tests, a witness block is a massive slab of metal located behind a test subject which totally stops further progress of projectile and impact subjects . Example of witness block material: duralumin cylinder.
